The Alaskan Eskimo is a 1953 American short documentary film produced by Walt Disney. It was the initial film in Disney's People & Places series. In 1954, it won an Oscar for Documentary Short Subject at the 26th Academy Awards.

Synopsis

References

External links

The Alaskan Eskimo at D23

1953 films
1953 documentary films
1953 short films
1950s short documentary films
American short documentary films
Best Documentary Short Subject Academy Award winners
Disney documentary films
Films set in Alaska
Inuit films
Short films directed by James Algar
Films produced by Walt Disney
Films scored by Oliver Wallace
Disney short films
Films with screenplays by Winston Hibler
1950s English-language films
1950s American films